Jaya One is a neighborhood shopping mall located at Section 13, Petaling Jaya, Selangor, Malaysia. It is currently split into The Square, The School and Retail Linkway.

History 
Developed and owned by Tetap Tiara Sdn Bhd, Jaya One first opened in 2008, with its Phase 1 Palm Square.

In 2013, Jaya One was expanded with the opening of The School, Malaysia's first child enrichment mall.

In 2018, following the closure of Palm Square (or The Palm) in March, reopened and reinvented it as The Square to further the mall.

In 2020, following the closure of its previous anchor tenant Cold Storage, the first "hybrid" AEON BIG hypermarket opened in July at The School.

Stores and services 
Some of the anchor tenants currently at Jaya One include hypermarket AEON BIG, rock climbing center BUMP Bouldering, fitness center Celebrity Fitness, hardware store Mr D.I.Y., lifestyle store NOKO and co-working space Common Ground.

Other stores and services include Guardian, The Children's House and Atap.co, as well as food and beverages Tiger Sugar, Streat Thai, Tedboy Bakery, Kim Lian Kee Hokkien Mee, Ippudo, Apple Samgyupsal, GO Noodle House, Nando's, OldTown White Coffee and Starbucks Coffee.

Jaya One also houses Pop The Arcade, the first pop-up retail space for startups of its kind in Malaysia.

PJ Live Arts, Selangor's first independent theatre dedicated to family and comedy shows is also located here.

Two non-governmental organizations, Kechara Food Bank and Parents Without Partners (PWP) are also based here.

Former tenants include Cold Storage, Old School, Amante Nail Spa & Body Care, Blok Space, MBG Fruit Shop, Wendy's and Fuwa Fuwa Bakery Cafe.

In addition Jaya One also contains various offices and businesses in its buildings, ranging from banks and properties to architecture firms.

On Friday evenings, the mall opens one of its floors to roller skating.

Parking 
With a total of 5 floors, from Ground floor to basement P4, Jaya One has up to 2,400 parking bays available, some of which are designated parking spots. Designated parking is included for handicaps, mothers with children, families with children, pregnant ladies, lone ladies and car poolers. There are two entrances into the parking bay.

Electric car charging stations are also available, as well as a car wash in the basement. Moreover, valet parking is available for hire.

Parking rates can be found on site, as well as on its website. A season pass and Touch 'n Go services are available.

Transportation

Train 
The mall is located a mere 10 minutes away from the  Asia Jaya station (opposite Menara Axis), and can be accessed from there via taxi or Rapid KL Bus to Jaya One.

Bus 
There are multiple buses connecting to Jaya One. From the  Asia Jaya station, take Rapid KL Bus T787 to Jaya One. From SS2, take Bus T790 or PJ02, followed by a ~6 minute walk to Jaya One.

Pet-friendliness 
Jaya One is a pet friendly mall, specifically The Square and Retail Linkway. A number of amenities are available to cater to pet-owners and their companions. These include pet parking, pet toilets, and pet-friendly lifts or escalators. There are also designated pet-friendly zones and shops, plus a pet-friendly lounge space. A pet marshal is also on constant duty.

References 

Shopping malls in Selangor
2008 establishments in Malaysia